Edward Said (1 November 1935 – 25 September 2003) was an American literary theorist, cultural critic, and political activist of Palestinian descent. He was University Professor of English and Comparative Literature at Columbia University, and edited several academic books. A founding figure in postcolonialism, he wrote dozens of books, lectures, and essays. Anthologies of his essays have been published, and several of his interviews and conversations have also been edited into book form.

Books by Said

Interviews and essays

Prefaces and editing work

Radio

 1993 BBC Reith Lectures: Representation of the Intellectual
 Audio: The Reith Lectures Archive 1976 - 2010 podcast
 Transcript: The Reith Lectures transcripts 1990 - 1999

Films 
1980s
 "In the Shadow of the West", The Arabs: A Living History, The 10-Part Series (1985). Minutes:50, The main focus is on the plight of the Palestinians which can be seen as the most enduring residue of the modern encounter between the Arabs and the West. Edward Said traces the course of European involvement with the Near East via the Crusades to Napoleon's campaign in Egypt and the French and English entrepreneurs, adventurers and empire builders who came in his wake.
 "Exiles: Edward Said" (TV Movie 1988) With Edward Said. Directed by Christopher Sykes. Production by 'BBC Two'. Edward Said, tells his story and the story of Palestine.
 “The Palestinians” (1988) television documentary prepared and presented by Edward Said and Ibrahim Abu Lughod. The Palestinians was a two-part historical documentary commissioned by Channel 4, produced by Taylor Downing, and directed by David Edgar.

1990s
 Pontecorvo: The Dictatorship of Truth (1992) (TV)
"Edward Said: A Very Personal View of Palestine". BBC documentary. May 1998. Broadcast in the United States by the Public Broadcasting System as "In Search of Palestine".
 "IN SEARCH OF PALESTINE", a documentary film about Palestine for BBC. that BBC was unsuccessful to in getting it on U.S. television.
 "The 20th Century: A Moving Visual History" (1999) TV mini-series - Columbia University
 L'autre (1999) / "The Other" - Europe (English title)

2000s
 Tragedy in the Holy Land: The Second Uprising. Orland Park, Ill.: MPI Home Video, 2002. Mueler, Dennis.
 Multiple Identities: Encounters with Daniel Barenboim (2002) (TV)
 Edward Said: The Last Interview (2004)

References

External links
 

Bibliographies by writer
Bibliographies of American writers
Bibliographies of Palestinian writers
Philosophy bibliographies
Edward Said